Gurmukh Singh "Garry" Sandhu, is an Indian singer, songwriter, rapper and actor known for his work in Punjabi music. Originally, he came to the United Kingdom on a work visa, and worked as a construction worker situated in the Birmingham area. Whilst working, he would aspire to eventually make his songwriting into an actual career. He made his singing debut in 2010 with song "Main Ni Peenda" and acting debut with the film Romeo Ranjha (2014). He has released songs including Illegal Weapon, Yeah Baby, Banda Ban Ja, Excuses etc. He also owns his record label Fresh Media Records. In 2019, his song "Yeah Baby" was released in a bollywood film De De Pyaar De as "Hauli Hauli". He has been nominated for many awards at PTC Punjabi Music Awards. On December 14, 2020, Business Today reported that Sandhu's song Illegal Weapon 2.0 was one of the top YouTube music videos in India.

Discography

Albums

EPs

Singles

As featured Artist or Lyricist

Songs in Movies

Filmography

Awards and nominations

References

External links 
 
 Coming Home - Garry Sandhu (A song sung by Garry Sandhu)
 https://www.mysoftduniya.com/2020/07/coming-home-lyrics-garry-sandhu-ft.html Coming Home - Garry Sandhu
 Garry Sandhu Sad Songs

1984 births
Living people
Indian male singer-songwriters
Indian singer-songwriters